Northern Arizona University (NAU) is a public research university based in Flagstaff, Arizona. It was founded in 1899 as the final public university established in the Arizona Territory, 13 years before Arizona was admitted as the 48th state.

NAU is one of the three universities governed by the Arizona Board of Regents and accredited by the Higher Learning Commission. As of fall 2022, 28,090 students were enrolled at NAU with 21,411 at the Flagstaff campus. The university is divided into seven academic colleges offering about 130 undergraduate degrees, 100 graduate programs, and various academic certificates. Students can take classes and conduct research in Flagstaff, online, and at more than 20 statewide locations, including the Phoenix Biomedical Campus.

The university is classified among "R2: Doctoral Universities – High research activity" and ranked No. 178 in the National Science Foundation (NSF) national research rankings for fiscal year 2021. NAU's astronomy faculty co-discovered several astronomical bodies, such as Eris and Sedna, led the observations of the NASA DART mission, and are major participants in the search for the hypothetical Planet Nine, with the university being a primary institution of the Lowell Observatory. NAU is a federally designated Hispanic Serving Institution.

The NAU Lumberjacks compete in the NCAA Division I, primarily as part of the Big Sky Conference, and have won several national championships, notably in cross country running.

History
Initially named the Northern Arizona Normal School, the institution opened on September 11, 1899, with 23 students, two faculty members—one, Almon Nicholas Taylor, who was also the school president—and "two copies of Webster's International Dictionary bound in sheepskin" as teaching resources. The first graduating class, in 1901, consisted of four women who received credentials to teach in the Arizona Territory. In 1925, the Arizona State Legislature allowed the school, which was then called the Northern Arizona State Teachers College (ASTC), to grant bachelor of education degrees. In 1929, the school became Arizona State Teachers College at Flagstaff.Also in 1929, the Great Depression struck the nation, and the ASTC found new meaning in community outreach. Rather than collapsing, the school endured through the depression. In fact, Grady Gammage, the school president at the time, described higher education as "a 'depression industry' that fared well in hard times." Despite financial difficulties, enrollment increased from 321 students to 535 students between 1930 and 1940, and graduate work was introduced in 1937.

ASTC provided an education during economically trying times, often creating jobs to help students afford their education; they worked in the school-owned dairy farm, in the campus kitchen and dining hall, and as newspaper deliverers. The self-sufficiency of the college helped conserve monetary resources, and it was a major contributor to the local economy of the surrounding Flagstaff community, injecting almost a half-million dollars in 1938.

ASTC was known for its diverse student body and ethnic tolerance. In fact, the first Hopi to receive a college degree was Ida Mae Fredericks in 1939. Students came from rural farms, mining families, the East Coast, and points between. During the depression, fraternities and clubs sprang up, reflecting the diversity of backgrounds and interests.

Enrollment dropped sharply at the beginning of World War II, dropping to 161 in 1945. During this time, ASTC became a Navy V-12 program training site. However, the end of World War II brought increased enrollment as returning veterans continued their education.

The end of the war also expanded programs beyond teaching degrees, especially in the fields of art and science. To reflect this growth, the school changed its name to Arizona State College at Flagstaff in 1945 and, in 1958, became Arizona State College. Also in 1958, the world-renowned forestry program was started. With further growth over the next two decades, the Arizona Board of Regents granted Arizona State College university status as Northern Arizona University in 1966.

Campuses

Flagstaff campus
Set across 829 forested acres, the Flagstaff campus houses academic, administrative, and residential buildings.

The main campus is surrounded by the largest contiguous ponderosa pine forest in the world and enjoys a four-season climate, with the host city of Flagstaff averaging 90.1 inches of snow per year. Flagstaff is regularly ranked among the best college towns in the United States.

For many years, the university has prioritized sustainability initiatives, and campus-wide programs and resources encourage the entire university community to get involved with sustainability efforts. There are more than a dozen LEED (Leadership in Energy and Environmental Design)-certified buildings on campus and all new construction must meet strict LEED standards. Dining services and facilities contribute to a composting initiative, collecting more than 300,000 pounds of material each year, which prevents 250 metric tons of carbon dioxide from entering the atmosphere. Much of the campus uses renewable wind and solar technologies and the university is investigating opportunities to utilize the vast ponderosa pine forests around campus for biomass electricity or heat production. NAU President José Luis Cruz Rivera pledged carbon neutrality at NAU by 2030.

Statewide campuses and NAU Online

In addition to the more than 21,000 students who study on the Flagstaff campus, NAU currently serves another 8,000 students online and statewide. In order to provide access and affordability to all Arizona residents, NAU offers more than 130 accredited degree programs at more than 20 statewide locations. NAU also has partnerships with community colleges and NAU–Yavapai, a collaboration with Yavapai College in Prescott Valley, Arizona. The university's oldest branch campus, and the largest, is NAU–Yuma.

NAU Online has two paths to degrees: traditional online and a subscription program.

Traditional online courses conform to the regular semester schedule and tuition is based on credit hours. 
The subscription online model has weekly start dates and students work at their own pace. Payment is based on a six-month flat subscription rate.

Academics

Colleges and programs 
Across seven colleges, NAU offers more than 130 undergraduate degree programs, more than 80 master's degree programs, and about 20 doctoral programs, along with 50 undergraduate and 40 graduate certificates.

The top undergraduate academic degree plans by enrollment for the 2021–2022 school year were:

 Nursing
 Psychology
 Business Economics
 Criminology and Criminal Justice
 Biology
 Biomedical Science
 Exercise Science

College of Arts and Letters
The College of Arts and Letters houses numerous departments, including:

School of Art
Comparative Cultural Studies
English
Global Languages and Cultures
History
Philosophy
Kitt School of Music
Theatre

The college also oversees the Clara M. Lovett Art Museum, Martin-Springer Institute (promoting lessons of the Holocaust), Northern Arizona Writing Project, Ardrey Memorial Auditorium, and Kitt Recital Hall. The College of Arts and Letters Film Series has provided quality classic films to the NAU and Flagstaff community for a decade, and has recently established the NAU International Film Series. CAL is also home to NAU's doctoral program in Applied Linguistics. Department faculty and students share their scholarly work and artistic achievement through more than 300 performances, lectures, films, and exhibitions annually.

College of Education
The College of Education is a cornerstone of NAU academics, with bachelor's, master's, and doctoral programs available. Programs focus on early childhood, elementary, secondary, and higher education. Fields of study include:

Educational Leadership
Educational Psychology
Educational Specialties (e.g., bilingual and multicultural education, career and technical education, educational technology, and special education)
STEM Education
Teaching and Learning

The college also houses the Diné Dual Language Teachers Professional Development Project that works with teachers with proficiency in the Diné (Navajo) language and high academic achievement to meet licensing requirements for teachers who work in language instruction education programs.

College of Engineering, Informatics, and Applied Sciences
The College of Engineering, Informatics, and Applied Sciences is NAU's newest college. Within CEIAS are 19 undergraduate majors, 5 minors, 13 master's, and 5 doctoral programs. The college includes schools and departments for:

Applied Physics and Materials Science
Civil and Environmental Engineering
Construction Management
Mechanical Engineering
School of Informatics, Computing, and Cyber Systems

Students have access to numerous research labs including:

Center for Ecosystem Science and Society
Center for Health Equity Research
Center for Materials Interfaces in Research and Applications
Merriam Powell Center for Environmental Research
Pathogen and Microbiome Institute

College of the Environment, Forestry, and Natural Sciences
The College of the Environment, Forestry, and Natural Sciences has undergraduate and graduate programs that integrate science and mathematics through the creative application of knowledge. Departments include:

Astronomy and Planetary Science - This program has direct access to the Lowell Observatory.
Biological Sciences
Chemistry and Biochemistry
School of Earth and Sustainability
School of Forestry
STEM Education
Mathematics and Statistics

More than 30 university-funded research institutes and centers are available to faculty and students, including:

Centennial Forest
Center for Ecosystem Science and Society
Colorado Plateau Biodiversity Center
Ecological Restoration Institute
National Institute for Climate Change Research

College of Health and Human Services

The College of Health and Human Services prepares students to become excellent health professionals and to provide service to improve the health and well-being of the communities served, particularly Arizona residents, Native Americans, and individuals considered disadvantaged. The college's departments—offering bachelor's, master's, and doctoral degrees—include:

Athletic Training
Communication Sciences and Disorders
Dental Hygiene
Health Sciences
Nursing
Occupational Therapy
Physical Therapy
Physician Assistant Studies

The College of Health and Human Services offers several programs at the Phoenix Bioscience Core, a state-of-the-art facility on 30 acres in downtown Phoenix that includes more than six million square feet of research, academic, and clinical facilities for students earning advanced degrees in medical professions.

College of Social and Behavioral Sciences
The College of Social and Behavioral Sciences offers a wide array of social science and related professional degree programs, including:

Anthropology
Applied Indigenous Studies
Communication
Criminology and Criminal Justice
Ethnic Studies
Geography, Planning, and Recreation
Politics and International Affairs
Psychological Sciences
Social Work
Sociology
Sustainable Communities
University Studies
Women's and Gender Studies

The college also houses the Civic Service Institute that connects students, older adults, and other community members to national service volunteer opportunities within their communities. The Institute for Human Development fosters the development of attitudes that promote the public's appreciation and value of individuals with disabilities.

The W. A. Franke College of Business

The W. A. Franke College of Business offers degrees at the undergraduate and master's levels. Businessman Bill Franke commitment of $25 million resulted in the renaming of the college in his honor in 2007. The Association to Advance Collegiate Schools of Business – AACSB International - renewed The W. A. Franke College of Business's accreditation in 2020.

The School of Hotel and Restaurant Management is located in the Eugene Hughes building on central campus with a high-tech demonstration kitchen, high-end conference room, and café. The college offers undergraduate degree programs and Master of Business Administration (MBA) programs.

Honors College
NAU is home to the first Honors program offered in Arizona. The academic enrichment program is open to students of all majors and offers coursework, research opportunities, and programs designed to enhance the undergraduate experience. Honors College students have unique opportunities for study abroad and can participate in out-of-classroom programs like Canyon Country Aesthetics. Freshman Honors students can live in the Honors Residence College, which offers living, learning, and study spaces under the same roof.

Graduate College
The Graduate College offers more than 80 master's degrees, about 20 doctoral degrees, and 40 graduate certificates, both in-person and online. NAU offers graduate students hands-on mentoring, and numerous research, scholarship, and creative activities. The NAU Graduate College supports all aspects of graduate education and provides professional development opportunities for students.

University College (dissolved)
University College was a portal for students to make efficient, informed decisions about pursuing academic paths. Undergraduate students automatically became a part of University College when admitted to Northern Arizona University. Various programs, resources, and support included academic transition programs, the First Year Learning Initiative, and the Bachelor of University Studies degree program.

Effective summer 2016, the University College was dissolved.

Research
Northern Arizona University is ranked No. 178 in the most recent National Science Foundation (NSF) national research rankings for fiscal year 2021 performance of $69.1 million. The research division's core facilities are the Environmental Genetics and Genomics Resource Center, Imaging and Histology Core Facility, and the Research Greenhouse Complex. Other research laboratories include the Centennial Forest, Child Speech and Language Lab, Colorado Plateau Analytical Lab, Geospatial Research and Information Laboratory, Laboratory for Applied Social Research, Merriam-Powell Research Station, RAPIDLab, Southwest Experimental Garden Array, and Walnut Creek Center for Education and Research. 
The Pathogen and Microbiome Institute conducts research to track and fight a host of rapidly evolving and potentially deadly diseases including COVID-19. More than 100 faculty, full-time staff, graduate and undergraduate students work in the institute.
Collections, archives and museums include The Arboretum at Flagstaff, Art Museum, Cline Library Special Collections and Archives, Colorado Plateau Biodiversity Center, and the Museum of Northern Arizona.

Northern Arizona University joined the Lowell Discovery Telescope partner group in 2014. NAU scientists use the LDT for deep imaging of small objects in the solar system. Additionally, NAU partners with Lowell at its Anderson Mesa site, both in the National Undergraduate Research Laboratory and in a new Near-Earth Object follow-up program. NAU also manages the National Undergraduate Research Observatory, which provides access to Lowell's 0.79-meter telescope for a consortium of four-year colleges around the country.

Rankings 

The Times Higher Education World University Rankings for 2021-2022 ranked NAU 501st-600th both internationally and nationally.

Admissions 
In February 2022, NAU announced an admissions pilot program to increase access to college for Arizona high school students. NAU will launch the program for the incoming class of fall 2023. Currently, NAU, like Arizona State University and the University of Arizona, requires 16 core courses for assured admissions. However, not all Arizona high schools offer the 16 core courses, especially in second languages and math. NAU's pilot program removes the second language course availability barrier and will accept more fourth-year math courses, allowing more students the opportunity to pursue a postsecondary education.

Fall Freshman Statistics

Tuition and fees 
The average cost of tuition and fees for a full-time, Arizona resident undergraduate student for the 2022–2023 school year is $12,274 and $26,286 for out-of-state undergraduates. NAU also participates in the Western Undergraduate Exchange Program, which offers lower tuition rates for students from the Western United States. For 2022–23, WUE tuition and fees are $16,536. NAU is also part of two programs, the Western Regional Graduate program and the Professional Student Exchange Program, that allow approved graduate students from other Western states to pay in-state tuition.

NAU's Access2Excellence (A2E) initiative, announced in April 2022 by President José Luis Cruz Rivera, will provide a tuition-free undergraduate college education for every Arizona resident with a household income of $65,000 or below, assuring tuition will be fully covered by scholarships and financial aid. Approximately 50 percent of Arizona households currently meet this financial threshold. These changes take effect in fall 2023 for first-year and transfer students who attend NAU in Flagstaff or at one of the university's sites throughout Arizona.

Native American initiatives 
Part of the NAU 2025 Elevating Excellence strategic roadmap is to be "the nation's leading university serving Indigenous Peoples." Many programs on and off campus have been established in support of this goal.

The Native American Cultural Center is a 12,000-square-foot facility that houses many programs built to support Indigenous students and functions as a social and cultural hub. The Office of Native American Initiatives supports students and Indigenous communities with programs including the Institute for Native-serving Educators, the Institute for Tribal Environmental Professionals, the Tribal Leadership Initiative, and the Office of Indigenous Student Success.

Martin-Springer Institute 
The Martin-Springer Institute was founded at NAU in 2000 to "raise awareness of human rights through Holocaust remembrance and education." The institute was founded by Holocaust survivor Doris Martin and her husband Ralph Martin. The institute, headed by Director Björn Krondorfer, hosts speakers, academic workshops, and symposia; mounts public exhibitions; funds research; and provides educational workshops and study tours for Arizona teachers.

Residence halls

NAU houses nearly 10,500 students on campus.

Freshman residence halls
Available freshman halls include Allen Hall, Campbell Hall, Cowden Hall, Honors College, McConnell Hall, Morton Hall, Reilly Hall, Sechrist Hall (a nine-story residence hall, the tallest building in northern Arizona), Taylor Hall, Tinsley Hall, and Wilson Hall.

Upper-division housing
Upper-division suite-style and apartment housing is available to sophomores, juniors, and seniors.

On-campus housing for upper-division students includes:

Calderón, Campus Heights, Gabaldon, Gillenwater, McDonald, McKay Village, Mountain View, Pine Ridge Village, Raymond, Roseberry, and South Village.

Residents of family units are within the Flagstaff Unified School District. Residents are zoned to Kinsey Elementary School, Mount Elden Middle School, and Flagstaff High School.

NAU partner housing by American Campus Communities
Rising juniors and seniors currently living on campus have priority leasing status for university-partnered housing located on campus. These halls are located on the NAU campus, but are operated by American Campus Communities: The Suites, Hilltop Townhomes, and Skyview.

Athletics 
Student-athletes compete at the intervarsity level in football (men); volleyball, soccer, golf, and swimming and diving (women); and basketball, cross country, indoor and outdoor track and field, and tennis (men and women). The university participates in 15 intercollegiate sports programs. NAU teams compete at the Walkup Skydome, a multipurpose building providing facilities for football, basketball, indoor track and field, soccer, weight lifting, lacrosse, student recreation, major concert events, commencements, intramurals, and a variety of other university and community activities.

The $47 million, 77,000 square-foot Student-Athlete High Performance Center opened in February 2022. The facility includes a 10,000-square-foot weight room, an academic center, basketball courts, an adjacent practice field, locker rooms, team meeting rooms, an auditorium, and sports-medicine spaces.
The Rolle Activity Center provides physical education classrooms and contains courts for recreational and varsity sports, including NAU's volleyball team, with seating for almost 1,100. The building was named after Joseph C. Rolle, “Mr. Lumberjack,” in 1989. Rolle played basketball from 1937 to 1941, served as student body president, and received a BA in 1941 and MA in education in 1950 from Arizona State College of Flagstaff. He later earned an EdS from Columbia University and then worked at NAU for 36 years in positions ranging from bookstore manager to dean of students and dean of university services.

The Wall Aquatic Center in the Aquatic and Tennis Complex is one of the finest high-altitude swimming facilities in the world.

The Lumberjacks compete at the NCAA Division I level in all sports. In football, the Lumberjacks compete at the Football Championship Subdivision level (formerly known as Division I-AA). NAU competes in the Big Sky Conference in all sports except swimming and diving, which are part of the Western Athletic Conference.

The Lumberjacks won the NCAA Men's Division I Cross Country Championship in 2016, 2017, 2018, 2020, 2021, and 2022. The 2017 repeat title closed out a perfect season with a 53-point victory, placing five athletes in the top 40. The victory was the lowest score (74) at the NCAA Championships since 2014, and the Lumberjacks became the first repeat champions since 2013–14. Director of Cross Country and Track and Field Michael Smith earned the Bill Dellinger Award as National Men's Coach of the Year and also picked up both the Big Sky's Men's and Women's Coach of the Year awards. In track and field, Smith was named the US Track & Field and Cross Country Coaches Association (USTFCCCA) Mountain Region Women's Indoor Coach of the Year in 2017 and 2018.

Maya Calé-Benzoor of Israel set the school outdoor long jump record at 20' 6" (6.10 m), NAU records in both the women's indoor and outdoor long (20' 6".00) and triple jumps (41' 3".75), and 40' 5".00 in the indoor triple jump. She was an NCAA All American in 1984. In 1989 she was inducted into the NAU Athletic Hall of Fame.

Because of its high elevation, NAU's facilities are sometimes used for altitude training by endurance athletes.

Student body and on-campus activities

Organizations
NAU has more than 400 recognized professional, academic, service, and social organizations; an intramural sports program; The Lumberjack student newspaper; and active residence hall organizations.

Advanced Media Lab 
The 2,000-square-foot lab offers undergraduate and graduate students opportunities to collaborate with scholars and researchers on grant-funded projects including mobile development, augmented and virtual reality, filmmaking, aerial drone cinematography, motion capture, and Esports.

Student-run media 
In the Social and Behavioral Sciences’ School of Communication, the Media Innovation Center (MIC) hosts several immersive learning programs where students practice journalism and filmmaking in real-world settings.

The Lumberjack
Students can work at The Lumberjack, covering news of NAU and the region for Jackcentral.com and social media, and a print edition circulated throughout Flagstaff. The student-run newspaper is more than a century old and has numerous journalism awards to its credit.

The MIC sports team is a multimedia organization allowing students to cover sports across Arizona for TV, online, social media, and print.

NAZ Today, KJACK Radio, UTV Studios
Through UTV Studios, students produce short films and two student film festivals during each academic year. UTV 62, a student-run cable channel, operates 24 hours daily, seven days a week on campus channel 62.

Students also produce NAZ Today, which is broadcast on cable television throughout northern Arizona. It is the only local newscast in the region. In 2018, NAZ Today received national recognition from the Broadcast Education Association for "best student television newscast produced more than four days weekly." Students in NAU's Strategic Communication program publish NAZ Today stories on Facebook and Twitter, and maintain the show's website.

KJACK (KLJXLP, 107.1 FM) is an FCC-licensed radio station that gives students hands-on learning of the basics of radio and broadcasting. In addition to popular and alternative music, KJACK students provide live sports broadcasts, talk shows, and news.

NAU's televised news program, NAZ Today, airs Monday through Thursday in Flagstaff on NPG cable channel 4; formerly, it also aired on UniversityHouse (Dish Network channel 9411) until it folded. Since the shutdown of Channel 2 news in August 2008, NAZ Today is now the only TV news source for the Flagstaff area.

Members of the MIC sports team cover sports across Northern Arizona for various media platforms in the MIC. Students also cover Baseball Spring Training and other major sporting events in Phoenix.

Recreation services
The John Haeger Health and Learning Center features include an indoor jogging track, a 38-foot climbing wall, a large weight room, a multipurpose gym, a cardio theatre, and 123,000 square feet of recreation opportunities. The center also includes all of the on-campus medical services and the offices for Disability Resources on campus.

Intramural and club sports
More than 30 competitive and recreational intramural opportunities in individual and team sports are available. Also, more than 40 sports clubs are classified as either competitive or recreational/instructional, including baseball, rugby, soccer, ice hockey, lacrosse, Quidditch, disc golf, kendo, mixed martial arts, and water polo. The club tennis team competes in the national USTA Tennis on Campus league and won the national Spring Invitational in 2017.

Movies and other events
Unions and Student Activities offers many services and events for the campus community, such as movies and the popular Friday night AfterHours program produced by Sun Entertainment. SUN also presents concerts, comedians, free movies, trivia nights, dodgeball, and many other special events each year. The College of Arts and Letters presents classic films every Tuesday night during the school year and more than 400 music and theatrical performances, lectures, films, and art exhibitions annually.

Alumni

The NAU Alumni Association represents more than 160,000 alumni.

Professional sports
The Arizona Cardinals of the NFL conducted their summer training camp at Northern Arizona University's Flagstaff campus for many years until 2013. The Cardinals left Flagstaff to conduct their camp in Glendale in 2013. Beginning in 2014, NAU entered into partnerships with the Phoenix Suns and the Phoenix Mercury of the NBA and WNBA respectively.

See also

List of forestry universities and colleges

Notes

References

External links

Northern Arizona University athletics website

 
Public universities and colleges in Arizona
Educational institutions established in 1899
Education in Coconino County, Arizona
Buildings and structures in Flagstaff, Arizona
1899 establishments in Arizona Territory
BSL3 laboratories in the United States
Universities and colleges accredited by the Higher Learning Commission